Bela consimilis is an extinct species of sea snail, a marine gastropod mollusk in the family Mangeliidae.

The length of the shell attains 6.6 mm, its diameter 2.2 mm. This extinct marine species was found in the Lower Pliocene strata in  East Anglia, Great Britain.

References

External links
 Image of Bela consimilis

consimilis